, born  on October 19, 1955, in Osaka Prefecture, is a Japanese TV personality, actor, voice actor, and theater director. He named himself after his high school Japanese La Salle Academy. His best-known anime role is Kankichi Ryotsu the lead character in Kochira Katsushika-ku Kameari Kōen-mae Hashutsujo which ran from 1999 to 2004 for 373 episodes.

Filmography

TV programs
Ore-tachi Hyokin Zoku (1981-1989, Fuji Television)
Quiz!! Hirameki Password (1986-1990, Mainichi Broadcasting System, TBS)
JanJan Saturday (1987-1990, Shizuoka Daiichi Television)
Takeshi Itsumi no Heisei Kyoiku Iinkai (1991-1997, Fuji Television)
Mokugeki! Dokyun (1994-2002, TV Asahi)
Burari Tochu Gesha no Tabi (1994, Nippon Television)
Watch! (2004-2005, TBS)
Evening 5 (2005-2006, TBS)

TV drama
Yoni mo Kimyo na Monogatari (1991, Fuji Television)
Teru Teru Kazoku (2003, NHK)
Kochira Katsushika-ku Kameari Kōen-mae Hashutsujo (2009, TBS), Ginji Ryotsu

Anime television series
Kochira Katsushika-ku Kameari Kōen-mae Hashutsujo, Kankichi Ryotsu
Gintama (Mayuzon (Special guest appearance))
G-Saviour (Gano)

Video games
Rasāru Ishii no Childs Quest (Nintendo Family Computer, Namco) June 23, 1989

Films
Romance (1992)
Godzilla vs. Mechagodzilla II (1993), oil research employee
Gamera 2: Attack of Legion (1996), Nazaki transmission staff member
About Her Brother (2010)
Wiseguy (2020)
The Devil Wears Jūnihitoe (2020)
We Couldn't Become Adults (2021)

Theater
Kochira Katsushika-ku Kameari Kōen-mae Hashutsujo (1999) Kankichi Ryotsu
Kochira Katsushika-ku Kameari Kōen-mae Hashutsujo Again (2001) Kankichi Ryotsu
Seven Souls in the Skull Castle (2004) Mamiana Jirouemon
Kochira Katsushika-ku Kameari Kōen-mae Hashutsujo: Detective Kaipan Strikes Back (2003) Kankichi Ryotsu
Kochira Katsushika-ku Kameari Kōen-mae Hashutsujo 30th Anniversary! (2006) Kankichi Ryotsu

References

External links
 Agency profile 
 Official blog 

Japanese comedians
1955 births
Living people
Male actors from Osaka